Evelyn Hoey (December 15, 1910 – September 11, 1935) was a Broadway theatre torch singer and actress.

Life and career 
Hoey was noted for her performances in Fifty Million Frenchmen and Good News. She began performing at the age of 10 in Minneapolis. As an adult she appeared in London, England and Paris, France. She had one movie credit with a role in the 1930 comedy Leave It To Lester. The film was directed by Frank Cambria and co-starred Lester Allen and Hal Thompson.

Mysterious death 
Hoey was found shot to death in an upstairs bedroom of oil heir Henry H. Rogers III's Indian Run Farm house, Wallace Township near Downingtown, Pennsylvania in 1935. A bullet was discharged in her brain on the night of September 11. She had been a guest at the home for a week. Others present there during this time were Rogers, photographer William J. Kelley, a Japanese cook, George Yamada, a butler, and Rogers' chauffeur, Frank Catalano. Hoey's body was removed to a morgue in Downingtown. Later the body was taken to the county hospital in West Chester, Pennsylvania for an autopsy.
 
Rogers was the son of a deceased  millionaire, Colonel Henry Huddleston Rogers Jr., a former Standard Oil executive. Colonel Rogers and his father Henry Huttleston Rogers had made millions in oil, together with the family of John D. Rockefeller. Rogers Jr. left virtually his entire inheritance to his wife, a daughter, and to a son from his daughter's first marriage. Henry H. Rogers III was excluded from the provisions of his father's will through the careful wording of lawyers. He lived on $500,000 annually from a trust fund provided by his father's will. The income was to go to him during his lifetime but would return to the estate when he died.

Rogers left his father's home when he was twenty. He found work in a Cleveland, Ohio machine shop, working for twenty five cents an hour. He wanted to become an engineer and aspired to complete his education in Oxford, England. Rogers eventually went to Hollywood to study camera technique. There he partnered with Harold McCracken to produce pictures. His first film was a comedy concerning nudism. He was estranged from his wife, the former Miss Virginia Lincoln, a physician's daughter from Cleveland. The couple were married in 1929.

Coroner's inquest 
At a coroner's inquest Rogers and Kelley both insisted they were seated in the living room on the first floor when they heard the shot that caused Hoey's death. Their testimony was supported by Yamada, Catalano, and a farmer who was present when he called to collect some wages he was owed. Rogers and Kelley were discharged by the coroner. They had been under $2,500 bail each. The coroner's jury returned an open verdict that Hoey killed herself in the second floor bedroom.

Grand jury 
In October 1935 District Attorney William E. Parke requested that a grand jury investigate the fatal shooting of Evelyn Hoey. The prosecutor asked that the shooting be studied as well as the conduct of members of the coroner's jury, and people with whom they had been in contact. Particularly he wanted to identify their association with certain newspaper men who covered the inquest. Parke believed the jury's verdict indicated they felt a homicide had been committed. After asking for a grand jury he said he did not know whether any new evidence had been found.

A jury of eighteen men and four housewives convened in West Chester on November 12, 1935. Among the witnesses was Hoey's singing coach, Victor Andoga, of New York City. Andoga testified that he believed Hoey committed suicide because of anguish over a love affair with a New York theatrical man. He said that she was also worried that her voice was failing. According to him she twice told him she wanted to end her life. 
Hoey confided to Andoga in 1932 that a man wanted to marry her but she was unwilling because of her affection for the theater man. She asked him to test her voice when she returned from a trip to Bermuda in 1934. Hoey disclosed to Andoga that she took the trip with the idea of
slipping off the ship overboard, but lost her nerve.

The grand jury concluded on November 18, following a week's inquiry, that Hoey committed suicide with a revolver by shooting herself in the head. They asserted that members of the coroner's jury were too intimately associated with news reporters. Grand jury members denied there was criminal interference with any juryman or the deputy coroner.

References 
 The New York Times, Asks Grand Jury Act In Evelyn Hoey Death, October 1, 1935, Page 24.
 New York Times, Miss Hoey's Death Laid To Romance, November 14, 1935, Page 15.
 New York Times, Grand Jury Finds Miss Hoey Suicide, November 19, 1935, Page 46.
 San Mateo Times and Daily News Leader, All In A Day, Thursday, October 3, 1935, Page 8.
 Syracuse Herald, Evelyn Hoey Slain at Party, H.H. Rogers In Custody, Thursday, September 12, 1935, Page 8.

External links 
 

American musical theatre actresses
American film actresses
1910 births
1935 suicides
Suicides by firearm in Pennsylvania
Actresses from Minneapolis
Musicians from Minneapolis
Torch singers
20th-century American actresses
20th-century American singers
Singers from Minnesota
20th-century American women singers